The 1892 Indiana gubernatorial election was held on November 8, 1892. Democratic nominee Claude Matthews defeated incumbent Republican Ira Joy Chase with 47.45% of the vote.

General election

Candidates
Major party candidates
Claude Matthews, Democratic, incumbent Secretary of State
Ira Joy Chase, Republican, incumbent Governor

Other candidates
Leroy Templeton, People's
Aaron Worth, Prohibition

Results

References

1892
Indiana
Gubernatorial